The Superannuation Act 1949 was an Act of Parliament passed in the United Kingdom by the Labour government of Clement Attlee. Amongst other changes, it ensured that pensions on a contributory basis were provided for the widow and dependants of an established civil servant. It also ensure that a civil servant retiring after his 50th birthday could retain accrued pension rights, which would become payable on his sixtieth birthday (although the Treasury could, on compassionate grounds, grant such a pension immediately).

See also
Superannuation Act

References

United Kingdom Acts of Parliament 1949